Synchalara argoplaca is a moth in the family Xyloryctidae. It was described by Edward Meyrick in 1907. It is found in Sri Lanka.

The wingspan is 25–28 mm. The forewings are dark bronzy-brown, becoming whitish-fuscous towards the dorsum and termen. There is a broad white patch extending along the costa from near the base to three-fourths, and reaching nearly half across the wing, the posterior edge inwardly oblique and somewhat concave. There is also an interrupted dark fuscous terminal line. The hindwings are whitish-fuscous.

References

Synchalara
Moths described in 1907
Taxa named by Edward Meyrick